Cohoes High School is a public high school located in Cohoes, Albany County, New York, U.S.A., and is the only high school operated by the Cohoes City School District.

Notable alumni 

 Theresa V. Brassard (class of 1947) – metallographer
 Aliann Pompey (class of 1995) - Olympic athlete

Footnotes

Schools in Albany County, New York
Public high schools in New York (state)